The 2018–19 FC Krasnodar season was the eighth successive season that Krasnodar played in the Russian Premier League, the highest tier of association football in Russia. They finished the previous season in 4th place, and as a result of FC Tosno failing to obtain a UEFA licence for their 2018–19 UEFA Europa League Group Stage spot, they qualified directly for the Groups Stage of the UEFA Europa League.

Season events
Dmitry Stotsky was Krasnodar's first summer signing, penning a four-year contract on 15 May, with Uroš Spajić becoming the second summer signing 11 days later, when he signed a five-year contract on 26 May.

On 9 July, German Onugkha signed from Volgar Astrakhan on a four-year contract, whilst Ivan Taranov signed a one-year contract on 11 July. On 13 July, Nikolay Markov returned to Krasnodar, signing a one-year contract. 6 days later, 19 July, Krasnodar announced the signing of Christian Cueva on a four-year contract.

On 10 August, Krasnodar announced the signing of Jón Fjóluson on a three-year contract.

Following Pavel Mamayev's arrest for assault in October, Krasnodar announced that they had imposed the maximum fine they could on Mamayev, removed him from first team training and were investigating how to terminate his contract.

On 27 November, Viktor Claesson extended his contract with Krasnodar until the end of June 2021.

On 28 May, Alyaksandr Martynovich, Cristian Ramírez, Yury Gazinsky and Ari all signed new contracts with the club.

Squad

Out on loan

Transfers

In

Out

Loans out

Released

Friendlies

Competitions

Russian Premier League

Results by round

Results

League table

Russian Cup

UEFA Europa League

Group stage

Knockout phase

Squad statistics

Appearances and goals

|-
|colspan="14"|Players away from the club on loan:

|-
|colspan="14"|Players who left Krasnodar during the season:

|}

Goal scorers

Disciplinary record

References

External links

FC Krasnodar seasons
Krasnodar
Krasnodar